Capitol Center or Capitol Centre or Capital Center or Capital Centre may refer to:

Singapore
Capitol Centre, Singapore

United Arab Emirates
Capital Centre (Abu Dhabi)

United Kingdom
Capitol Centre, Cardiff, a shopping mall

United States
Capitol Center (Salem, Oregon), the tallest office building in Salem
Capitol Center (Columbia, South Carolina), the tallest building in South Carolina
Hilton Baton Rouge Capitol Center, a hotel in Baton Rouge, Louisiana
Capital Centre (Landover, Maryland), a former sports arena near Washington, D.C.
Capital Center South Tower, Indianapolis, Indiana
Capitol Center for the Arts, Concord, New Hampshire, also known as "Capitol Center"